Tropidodryas is a genus of snakes of the subfamily Dipsadinae.

Species
 Tropidodryas serra (Schlegel, 1837)
 Tropidodryas striaticeps (Cope, 1870)

References

Dipsadinae
Snake genera